Nalikwanda is a constituency of the National Assembly of Zambia. It covers part of Mongu District in Western Province.

List of MPs

References 

Constituencies of the National Assembly of Zambia 
1964 establishments in Zambia 
Constituencies established in 1964